Miracle on Grass may refer to:

 United States v England (1950 FIFA World Cup), an association football match in 1950 in which the United States defeated England
 Miracle on Grass (Australian rules football), an AFL match in 2013 in which the Brisbane Lions defeated the Geelong Cats

See also 

 Miracle on Ice